Tucana (AK-88) was never commissioned and thus never bore the USS designation. She was transferred upon  launching on 13 September 1944 to the U.S. Army as the U.S. Army Engineer Port Repair ship  Arthur C. Ely.

Service career 
AK-88 was originally authorized under Maritime Commission contract (MC hull 651) and assigned the name MV Symmes Potter. The name Tucana was assigned to her by the Navy on 30 October 1942; and, on 1 January 1943, her contract was transferred from the Maritime Commission to the supervision of the Navy; AK-88 to become an Enceladus-class cargo ship. The ship was laid down on 24 April 1944 at Camden, New Jersey, by the Penn-Jersey Shipbuilding Corp.; launched on 13 September 1944; and sponsored by Mrs. Patrick J. Cushing. On that same day, she was reassigned and delivered to the Army, and her name was struck from the Navy list.

She was converted by the U.S. Army to serve as the U.S. Army Engineer Port Repair ship Arthur C. Ely. The ship was not among the converted vessels first deployed overseas in the last half of 1944.

Footnotes

References

External links 
 NavSource Online: Service Ship Photo Archive - AK-88 Tucana - Arthur C. Ely
 United States Army in World War II - The Corps of Engineers: Troops and Equipment - Chapter XVII - Preparing to Reconstruct Ports

 

Port repair ships of the United States Army
Enceladus-class cargo ships
Ships built in Camden, New Jersey
1944 ships
Type N3 ships of the United States Army
World War II auxiliary ships of the United States